Japan Camera opened its first store in 1959. Since then, it has grown to become a successful chain of over 100 stores across North America. The store opened the first one-hour photofinishing lab in North America. There are a few in Toronto.

In Quebec, the chain is known as Centre Japonais De La Photo.

External links
Japan Camera

Consumer electronics retailers of Canada
Retail companies established in 1959